(September 15, 1950 – December 15, 2016) was a director of anime series. Iuchi directed Crush Gear Turbo, Mashin Hero Wataru, Yamato Takeru and several other series.

Director

Television
 chief/series director denoted in bold
 Gaiking (1976)
 Star of the Giants (1977)
 Cho Super Car Gattaiger (1977)
 Shin Ace o Nerae! (1978)
 Galaxy Express 999 (1978-1981)
 The Monster Kid (1980-1982)
 Queen Millennia (1981)
 Ninjaman Ippei (1982)
 Aura Battler Dunbine (1983-1984)
 Lady Georgie (1983-1984)
 God Mazinger (1984)
 Heavy Metal L-Gaim (1984-1985)
 Mobile Suit Zeta Gundam (1985-1986)
 Onegai! Samia-don (1985-1986)
 Pro Golfer Saru (1985-1988)
 Honey Bee in Toycomland (1986-1987)
 Metal Armor Dragonar (1987-1988)
 Mashin Hero Wataru (1988-1989)
 Madö King Granzört (1989-1990)
 Mashin Hero Wataru 2 (1990-1991)
 Mama wa Shōgaku 4 Nensei (1992)
 Yamato Takeru (1994)
 Kuma no Putaro (1996)
 Shōnen Santa no Daibôken (1996)
 Super Mashin Hero Wataru (1997-1998)
 Crush Gear Turbo (2001-2003)
 Samurai 7 (2004)
 Onmyō Taisenki (2004-2005)
 Yakitate!! Japan (2004-2006)
 Speed Grapher (2005)
 Sgt. Frog (2005-2011)
 Dinosaur King (2007)
 Pretty Rhythm: Aurora Dream (2011-2012)
 Pretty Rhythm: Dear My Future (2012-2013)
 Pretty Rhythm: Rainbow Live (2013-2014)
 Gundam Build Fighters Try (2014-2015)
 Aikatsu! (2015)
 Jewelpet: Magical Change (2015)
 Rilu Rilu Fairilu ~Yousei no Door~ (2016)
 Flowering Heart (2016)
 Shōnen Maid (2016)
 Seisen Cerberus (2016)
 Shōnen Ashibe: GO! GO! Goma-chan (2016)

Film
 Galaxy Investigation 2100: Border Planet (1986)

OVAs
 Love Position - The Legend of Halley (1985)
 Mashin Hero Wataru: The Mashin Mountains (1989)
 Mashin Hero Wataru: The Story of the End of Time (1993-1994)
 Yamato Takeru: After War (1995)
 Kodocha (1997)
 The Galaxy Railways: A Letter from the Abandoned Planet (2007)

Writer
 series head writer denoted in bold
 Mashin Hero Wataru (1988-1989)
 Madö King Granzört (1989-1990)
 Mashin Hero Wataru 2 (1990-1991)
 Mama wa Shōgaku 4 Nensei (1992)
 Pretty Rhythm: Aurora Dream (2011-2012)
 Pretty Rhythm: Dear My Future (2012-2013)
 Pretty Rhythm: Rainbow Live (2013-2014)

References

External links
 
 

1950 births
2016 deaths
Anime directors
People from Kanagawa Prefecture